Tactusa sine is a moth of the family Erebidae first described by Michael Fibiger in 2010. It is known from northern Vietnam.

The wingspan is about 13 mm. The ground colour of the forewing is brown, with a dark brown medial and costa patch of the basal area. All crosslines are present, except the basal line, they are dark brown. The terminal line is indicated by black interneural dots. The hindwing is dark grey, with an indistinct discal spot and the underside is unicolorous grey.

References

Micronoctuini
Taxa named by Michael Fibiger
Moths described in 2010